Sushant City, Jaipur is a newly developed colony on the outskirt of Jaipur. It is on Kalwar Road, Jaipur just 5 km ahead of Govindpura, Jaipur.

Nearby colonies are Anand Lok, Kalwad, Global City, Anand Lok Extension, Sukh Sagar Englave, Govindpura, Ganesh Nagar Extn to name few. The city is yet not properly ready to settle in.

MPS

Nearest schools/colleges

 Spring Dales School, Sushant City
 Sufal Vidya Peeth School
 Care International School
 Tulip Public School
 Shri Krishna Secondary School
 Biyani Engineering College Jaipur
 Sri Kalyan World School
 Global International Academy

References

External links
Watch It on google maps
 Visit the Facebook page of Sushant City

Neighbourhoods in Jaipur